Mariusz Szyszka (born 18 January 1988) is a Polish former footballer, who played as a defender.

Career
He began his career at Sparta Oborniki, later joining Amica Wronki. He debuted for Lech Poznań in the Ekstraklasa on 24 November 2007, playing against ŁKS Łódź. Lech Poznań loaned him out to Pogoń Szczecin and Polonia Słubice during the 2008–09 season.

He then trialled for Nielba Wągrowiec and debuted against Gryf Kamień Pomorski, a 2-0 away win in the 2009-10 Polish Cup. He left the club at the end of the season in June 2010.

He then unsuccessfully trialled for Bałtyk Gdynia and Tur Turek, before returning to Polonia. In November 2010, after an unsuccessful trial with Pogoń Szczecin he left Polonia after termination of his contract.

At the age of 23, in February 2011, he trialled for Calisia Kalisz before being announced as a new signing. However he lasted only half a season before spells with lower league clubs Lubuszanin Trzcianka, Sparta Oborniki and Świt Piotrowo.

References

Bibliography

Polish footballers
Amica Wronki players
Lech Poznań players
Pogoń Szczecin players
Polonia Słubice players
Nielba Wągrowiec players
Calisia Kalisz players
1988 births
Living people
People from Oborniki County
Sportspeople from Greater Poland Voivodeship
Association football defenders